Richfield is a village in Summit County, Ohio, United States. The population was 3,648 at the 2010 census.  The village and the adjacent Richfield Township are approximately equidistant between the downtown areas of Akron and Cleveland.  It is part of the Akron metropolitan area.  Richfield is the sister city of Wolfach, Germany.

History
Richfield was founded in 1809 and incorporated in 1967. The village was named for the richness of their soil.

In 1850 William Cullen Wilcox was born here. He was honoured by the South African Government in 2009.

In 1970, Mayor Kenneth Swan signed an ordinance declaring Richfield Village the first "world city" in the United States.

Richfield was the home of the Cleveland Cavaliers from 1974 until 1994. They played at the Coliseum at Richfield.

Geography
Richfield is located at  (41.233722, -81.632228).

Demographics

2010 census
At the 2010 census there were 3,648 people, 1,384 households, and 1,049 families living in the village. The racial makeup of the village was 96.8% White, 0.7% African American, 0.1% Native American, 1.4% Asian, and 1.0% from two or more races. Hispanic or Latino of any race were 0.6%.

Of the 1,384 households 32.6% had children under the age of 18 living with them, 63.2% were married couples living together, 7.9% had a female householder with no husband present, 4.6% had a male householder with no wife present, and 24.2% were non-families. 20.7% of households were one person and 8.3% were one person aged 65 or older. The average household size was 2.57 and the average family size was 2.99.

The median age in the village was 46.4 years. 23.4% of residents were under the age of 18; 5.5% were between the ages of 18 and 24; 18.6% were from 25 to 44; 34.7% were from 45 to 64; and 17.8% were 65 or older. The gender makeup of the village was 50.4% male and 49.6% female.

2000 census
At the 2000 census there were 3,286 people, 1,227 households, and 952 families living in the village. The population density was 387.1 people per square mile (149.4/km). There were 1,272 housing units at an average density of 149.8 per square mile (57.8/km).  The racial makeup of the village was 97.35% White, 0.49% African American, 0.30% Native American, 1.31% Asian, 0.03% Pacific Islander, 0.06% from other races, and 0.46% from two or more races. Hispanic or Latino of any race were 0.24%.

Of the 1,227 households 31.9% had children under the age of 18 living with them, 67.2% were married couples living together, 7.2% had a female householder with no husband present, and 22.4% were non-families. 19.1% of households were one person and 8.1% were one person aged 65 or older. The average household size was 2.61 and the average family size was 2.99.

The age distribution was 23.6% under the age of 18, 5.1% from 18 to 24, 26.0% from 25 to 44, 28.2% from 45 to 64, and 17.1% 65 or older. The median age was 43 years. For every 100 females there were 98.2 males. For every 100 females age 18 and over, there were 95.3 males.

The median household income was $82,955 and the median family income  was $91,955. Males had a median income of $51,052 versus $30,431 for females. The per capita income for the village was $32,888. About 3.3% of families and 3.5% of the population were below the poverty line, including 1.6% of those under age 18 and 6.7% of those age 65 or over.

Education
Richfield has a public library, a branch of the Akron-Summit County Public Library.

References

External links
 Village website

Villages in Summit County, Ohio
Villages in Ohio
Populated places established in 1809
Populated places established in 1967